The event known as Second Siege of Montevideo took place between 1812 and 1814, when the patriotic troops led by José Rondeau besieged the city of Montevideo, still held by Spanish loyalists under the leadership of Gaspar de Vigodet, governor of Montevideo. The siege was successful and marked the end of the Spanish presence in present-day Uruguay.

During this whole period and just like in the failed first siege of Montevideo, supplied from over the sea, the city held out, until 17 May 1814. Then, the naval victories of Admiral William Brown, cut off the supply route and the city faced starvation. By the end of June, Vigodet was forced to surrender Montevideo to General Carlos María de Alvear.

See also
 Battle of Cerrito
 Dissolution of the Viceroyalty of the Río de la Plata
 Gaspar de Vigodet
 José Rondeau

References 

Montevideo 1812
History of Montevideo
Montevideo 1812
Battles of the Argentine War of Independence
1812 in Uruguay
1813 in Uruguay
1814 in Uruguay
Conflicts in 1812
Conflicts in 1813
Conflicts in 1814
19th century in Montevideo